Neil A. Johnson (born April 17, 1943) is a retired American basketball player born in Jackson, Michigan.

A 6'7" forward/center from Creighton University, Johnson played four seasons in the National Basketball Association as a member of the New York Knicks (1966–1968) and Phoenix Suns (1968–1970), then spent three seasons (1970–1973) in the American Basketball Association with the Virginia Squires. He averaged 6.9 points and 5.3 rebounds per game in his professional career and appeared in the 1971 ABA All-Star Game.

Known as an "enforcer", Johnson is remembered in the ABA oral history book Loose Balls for punching Warren Jabali in a game between the Virginia Squires and Denver Rockets. Referee John Vanak called the punch "the most devastating punch [he'd] ever seen on the court". According to Vanak, Jabali was one of the most physical players in the ABA, and had been shoving Johnson and his teammates throughout the game until Johnson retaliated. Dave Twardzik of the Squires recalled, "It scared the hell out of me, but the guys on my team were loving it because the whole league hated Jabali."

References

1943 births
Living people
American men's basketball players
Baltimore Bullets (1963–1973) draft picks
Basketball players from Michigan
Centers (basketball)
Creighton Bluejays men's basketball players
George Washington Educational Campus alumni
New York Knicks players
Phoenix Suns expansion draft picks
Phoenix Suns players
Power forwards (basketball)
Sportspeople from Jackson, Michigan
Virginia Squires players